In discrete event simulation concurrent estimation  is a technique used to estimate the effect of alternate parameter settings on a discrete event system. For example from observation of a (computer simulated) telecommunications system with a specified buffer size , one estimates what the performance would be if the buffer size had been set to the alternate values . Effectively the technique generates (during a single simulation run)  alternative histories for the system state variables, which have the same probability of occurring as the main simulated state path; this results in a computational saving as compared to running  additional simulations, one for each alternative parameter value.

The technique was developed by Cassandras, Strickland and Panayiotou.

References

Control theory
Events (computing)